Bezenchuk is an urban locality (an urban-type settlement) in Bezenchuksky District of Samara Oblast, Russia. Population:

Climate

References

Urban-type settlements in Samara Oblast